Hystricovoria is a monospecific genus of flies in the family Tachinidae.

References

Dexiinae
Diptera of Asia
Diptera of Africa
Tachinidae genera
Taxa named by Charles Henry Tyler Townsend